Lieutenant General Carl Henry Tottie (14 June 1888 – 2 May 1952) was a Swedish Army officer. Tottie's senior commands include Executive Officer of Svea Life Guards, Chief of the Army Staff and the General Staff Corps and military commander of the II Military District.

Early life
Tottie was born on 14 June 1888 in Hedvig Eleonora Parish, Stockholm, Sweden, the son of Colonel Charles Tottie and his wife Elisabeth Uggla. Tottie passed studentexamen in Gävle in 1907.

Career
Tottie was graduated from Military Academy Karlberg in 1909 and was commissioned as an officer with the rank of Underlöjtnant the same year and was assigned to Bohuslän Regiment, where he was promoted to Lieutenant in 1914. He served in the Topographic Department of the General Staff in 1915 and 1916, attended the Royal Swedish Army Staff College from 1916 to 1918, and was an aspirant in the General Staff from 1919 to 1921. Tottie was promoted to Captain in 1921, and served in the staff of the 4th Army Division (IV. arméfördelningen) from 1921 and in Bohuslän Regiment from 1923. He served in Hälsinge Regiment from 1928 to 1930 and from 1930 to 1936, Tottie served again in the General Staff, among other thing as chief adjutant from 1931 to 1932, as head of the Organisation Department from 1932 to 1935 and again as chief adjutant from 1935 to 1936.

Tottie was promoted to Major in 1931 and to Lieutenant Colonel in 1935. He was then assigned as Vice Chief of the Military Office of the Land Defence from 1935 to 1937, promoted to Colonel in the General Staff Corps in 1937, and he served as Chief of the Military Office of the Land Defence from 1937 to 1938. Tottie was Executive Officer of Svea Life Guards from 1938 to 1942 and Acting Deputy Commander of the 2nd Army Division (II. arméfördelningen) from 1941 to 1942. He then served as Chief of the Army Staff and of the General Staff Corps from 1942 to 1943. He was also chairman of Sakkunniga rörande den andliga vården inom försvarsväsendet ("The Experts on Spiritual Care Within the Swedish Defence") from 1937 to 1938, chairman of the Centralrådet för religiös och kulturell verksamhet inom försvarsväsendet ("Central Council for Religious and Cultural Activities in the Swedish Defence") from 1939 to 1942 and chairman of the 1940 Military Social Welfare Committee. In 1943, he was promoted to Major General and then he served as military commander of the II Military District 1943–1951. Tottie filed for dismissal because of a serious leg injury sustained in the service and transferred in 1951 as Lieutenant General to the reserve.

Death
Tottie died on 2 May 1952 in Oscar Parish, Stockholm. He was interred at Norra begravningsplatsen in Stockholm on 15 May 1952.

Personal life
In 1922 he married Elsa Söderhielm (1897–1978), the daughter of Major General Erik Söderhielm and Signe Gadd.

Dates of rank
1909 – Underlöjtnant
1914 – Lieutenant
1921 – Captain
1931 – Major
1935 – Lieutenant Colonel
1937 – Colonel
1943 – Major General
1951 – Lieutenant General

Awards and decorations
  Commander Grand Cross of the Order of the Sword (6 December 1950)
  Commander 1st Class of the Order of the Sword (5 June 1943)
  Commander 2nd Class of the Order of the Sword (6 June 1940)
  Knight 1st Class of the Order of the Sword (1930)
  Knight of the Order of the Polar Star (1936)
  Knight 1st Class of the Order of Vasa (1931)

Honours
Member of the Royal Swedish Academy of War Sciences (1935)

References

1888 births
1952 deaths
Swedish Army lieutenant generals
Military personnel from Stockholm
Commanders Grand Cross of the Order of the Sword
Knights of the Order of the Polar Star
Knights First Class of the Order of Vasa
Members of the Royal Swedish Academy of War Sciences
20th-century Swedish military personnel
Burials at Norra begravningsplatsen